Dave Wilson Nursery is the largest wholesale grower of fruit trees for the home garden in the United States. It’s afamily-owned and operated nursery established in 1938, and now a corporation. Its growing grounds are east of Modesto, California, near Hickman, California; and its regional office and variety test block are situated east of Reedley, California. The nursery, says its website, is the primary licensee and propagator (in the United States) of new fruit varieties developed by Zaiger's Genetics, including the Pluot and the Aprium.

References

External links
 Official Dave Wilson Nursery website
 Dave Wilson forums

Horticultural companies of the United States
Garden centres
Companies based in Fresno County, California
Agriculture companies established in 1938
American companies established in 1938
Retail companies established in 1938
1938 establishments in California